Loremaster may refer to:

 Loremaster (Dungeons & Dragons), a prestige character class in the Dungeons & Dragons 3rd edition role-playing game
 Lore-master, a character class in The Lord of the Rings Roleplaying Game
 Loremaster, a series of campaign modules for the Rolemaster role-playing game
 The Loremaster, a level boss in the video game Strife